U.S. Route 101, or U.S. Highway 101 (US 101), is a north–south United States Numbered Highway that runs through the states of California, Oregon, and Washington, on the West Coast of the United States. It merges at some points with California State Route 1 (SR 1).

Though US 101 remains a major coastal north–south link along the Pacific coast north of San Francisco, it has been replaced in overall importance for transport through the West Coast states by Interstate 5 (I-5), which is more modern in its physical design, goes through more major cities, and has more direct routing due to significantly easier geography over much of the route. US 101 is a major parallel route between Los Angeles and San Francisco, and is an alternative to the Interstate for most of its length. In 1964, California truncated US 101's southern terminus in Los Angeles, as I-5 replaced it. The old road is known as County Route S21 (CR S21) or Historic Route 101 in northern San Diego County.

The nearly  highway's northern terminus is in Tumwater, Washington: the route remains along the Olympic Peninsula's coastal perimeter west, north, and east; the northernmost point on the highway is in Port Angeles. The southern terminus of US 101 is in Los Angeles at the East Los Angeles Interchange, the world's busiest freeway interchange.

Numbering
According to the American Association of State Highway and Transportation Officials's (AASHTO) numbering scheme for United States Numbered Highways, three-digit route numbers are generally subsidiaries of two-digit routes. However, the principal north–south routes were assigned numbers ending in 1. Rather than number the west coast highway US 91, and lose four available north–south numbers (93, 95, 97, and 99) which, under the numbering plan, are supposed to be west of US 91, or assign the primary west coast highway a "lesser" number (one not ending in 1), AASHTO made an exception to its two-digit rule. Thus, US 101 is treated as a primary, two-digit route with a "first digit" of 10, rather than a spur of US 1, which is located along the east coast, on the opposite side of the U.S. Thus, US 101, not US 99, is the westernmost north–south route in the U.S. Highway System.

Route description

|-
|CA
|
|-
|OR
|
|-
|WA
|
|-
|Total
|
|}
US 101 is called the Oregon Coast Highway in Oregon, and the Pacific Highway in parts of California. It is also called "The 101" (pronounced "the one oh one") by Southern Californians or simply "101" by residents of Northern California, Oregon, and Washington. From north of San Francisco and continuing almost to Oregon it is also signed as the Redwood Highway though not often spoken of as such outside organizations responsible for tourism marketing. Urban portions of the route in Southern California are named the Santa Ana Freeway, Hollywood Freeway, and Ventura Freeway at various points between East Los Angeles and Carpinteria, California. In 2008, the portion of US 101 that runs from the Conejo Grade to the Old Town district of Camarillo was dedicated as the Adolfo Camarillo Memorial Highway to honor the city's namesake and extends through the boundaries of the original Camarillo family ranch. In 2003, the portion of US 101 in Ventura County was named Screaming Eagles Highway in honor of the US Army 101st Airborne Division. Urban portions of the route in the Bay Area are called the James Lick Freeway, Bayshore Freeway, and Central Freeway. A portion of the route between Cochrane Road in Morgan Hill and SR 85 in San Jose is named the Sig Sanchez Freeway. The section of highway between SR-85 in Mountain View and Embarcadero Road in Palo Alto is officially known as the Frederick E. Terman Highway. Street routings in San Francisco are more commonly referred to by their street names rather than the route number. Portions of the route between Southern California and the Bay Area are named El Camino Real or El Camino Real Freeway, but such names are rarely used colloquially; the route number is used instead. In Northern California the section of US 101 between Sonoma and Marin counties is often referred to as the Novato Narrows because of the reduction from six lanes to four.

California

In Southern California, the highway is a heavily traveled commuter route serving the Northwest portion of the Greater Los Angeles area; this includes Ventura County communities in the West Conejo Valley and in the Oxnard Plain, along with Los Angeles County communities in the East Conejo Valley and San Fernando Valley. The route is the Santa Ana Freeway from East Los Angeles to Downtown Los Angeles. It becomes the Hollywood Freeway north of Downtown Los Angeles through the Cahuenga Pass, before turning west and becoming the Ventura Freeway. Communities along the alignment include Hollywood and the southern edge of the San Fernando Valley, and the cities of Hidden Hills, Calabasas, Agoura Hills, Westlake Village, Thousand Oaks (includes Newbury Park), Camarillo, Oxnard, Ventura, Santa Barbara, Santa Maria, Pismo Beach, San Luis Obispo and Atascadero.

In Northern California, US 101 is the primary coastal route providing motorists access in and out of the San Francisco Bay Area, as well as the primary commuter route between San Francisco and the North Bay. It is one of two major freeway routes connecting San Jose and Silicon Valley with San Francisco and the North Bay. It serves as a more urban alternative to the rural I-280, as US 101 runs through Peninsula cities closer to the Bay, while I-280 runs closer to the Santa Cruz Mountains and Skyline Boulevard. Through northern San Francisco, US 101 remains routed on congested city streets due to freeway revolts, leaving the city northbound via the Golden Gate Bridge. It then departs the immediate coast and continues through wine country and redwood forests until it re-emerges coastside at Eureka. The route provides access through the extraordinarily rugged and scenic terrain of the North Coast and into vast groves of protected redwoods in area parks, including Redwood National and State Parks, before reaching the Oregon border.

In areas where US 101 turns inland, SR 1 branches off to serve the coastal communities.

Unlike Washington, California does not sign the long east–west section of US 101 between Gaviota and its junction with SR 134 and SR 170 in North Hollywood as west and east. Instead, the California Department of Transportation (Caltrans) observes the overall direction of the highway and marks these portions as north and south. Local references to this portion of the freeway, including traffic reports, usually refer to the directions on this section as east for southbound lanes and west for northbound lanes. In the late 1990s, Caltrans began placing guide signs on local streets in the San Fernando Valley adjacent to US 101 which identified eastbound and westbound entrances to the freeway. Other than replacing older guide signs which previously referenced the official northbound and southbound designations of the freeway, Caltrans made no other changes to mainline or street signing, and as such, pull-through signs, overhead signs, and freeway entrance signs all still reference north and south instead of east and west.

Oregon

It crosses the Chetco River at Brookings, the Rogue River in Gold Beach, the Coquille River just north of Bandon, Coos Bay at North Bend via the McCullough Bridge (named after the engineer who designed a series of bridges built on the Oregon Coast in the 1930s), the Umpqua at Reedsport, the Siuslaw in Florence, Yaquina Bay at Newport, and Youngs Bay and the Columbia River at Astoria. The stretch between Florence and Yachats is considered one of the more attractive segments of this highway. There are at least 86 Oregon state parks along the Pacific coast, including the Heceta Head Lighthouse. There are also many scenic bridges along the Oregon Coast that carry US 101, such as the Yaquina Bay Bridge in Newport. Because US 101 forms the main street of almost all of the coastal towns in Oregon (with the exception of Cannon Beach, Pacific City and a few others), traffic is often congested and slow in the summer months. The highway crosses the mouth of the Columbia River over the  Astoria-Megler Bridge at Astoria into Washington, and follows the Columbia downstream to Ilwaco.

Oregon Route 42 (OR 42 and OR 42S) have taken over old portions of US 101 around Coquille following a bypass. Reconstructions of US 101 in the post-World War II era shortened distances and eliminated the worst narrow curvy sections in various places on the Oregon Coast.

Washington

Entering Washington state at the north end of the Astoria–Megler Bridge west of Megler at the intersection with SR 401, US 101 follows the northern banks of the Columbia River until Ilwaco.  At this point it turns to the northeast and follows the shore of Willapa Bay and the Willapa River as far as Raymond, from which it proceeds directly north to Aberdeen, offering access from this city into the Olympic National Park. A roughly  segment from Kalaloch to Ruby Beach was the last portion of the Olympic Loop Highway or Olympic Highway to be built; it was constructed from 1927 to 1931.

In the northwestern part of the peninsula, US 101 turns east, and runs along the peninsula's northern edge, parallel to the Strait of Juan de Fuca. In the peninsula's northeast corner an expressway goes through Sequim. East of Sequim, US 101 turns southward along the western shore of Hood Canal, leading to Shelton. Upon reaching Shelton, US 101 turns into a two-lane bypass that changes to a freeway at the junction of SR 3, merging with SR 8 and finally ending at I-5 at its "northern" terminus in Tumwater, adjacent to the state capital of Olympia.

Between the intersection with SR 113, on the western edge of the Olympic Mountains, US 101 is signed east–west, and roughly south of the intersection with SR 20, US 101 is signed north–south but having turned around 180°. The direct route between the towns of Aberdeen (on the coast) and Olympia is US 12 and SR 8.

The Washington section of US 101 is defined in the Revised Code of Washington §47.17.165.

History

Parts of Historic US 101 can still be found in San Diego County between Oceanside and the border with Mexico under a variety of different names. Through Oceanside it is called Coast Highway. In Carlsbad it becomes Carlsbad Boulevard, but to the south in Encinitas it is Coast Highway 101. Solana Beach keeps it consistent with Highway 101, but Del Mar changes it to Camino Del Mar. All of those together make up CR S21. From there it continues along Torrey Pines Road, La Jolla Village Dr and Gilman Dr to merge with I-5 in La Jolla. On I-5, it breaks away from the freeway to follow Mission Bay Dr (former I-5 bus.) before rejoining I-5. The old US 101 routing continues on I-5 in San Diego until Pacific Highway, the old US 101 freeway a little west of current I-5. It then continues on Harbor Drive and Broadway through Downtown San Diego and Chula Vista, then onto National City Boulevard in National City. As it returns to San Diego on its way to the Mexican border, it follows Beyer Blvd through Otay Mesa and then through other parts of San Diego near the border on east Beyer Blvd and east San Ysidro Blvd in San Ysidro. The southern parts of I-5 were US 101 for a period before I-5 was completed also. All have been decommissioned, but the roadways still exist and are occasionally signed as Historic 101.

Most of Historic 101 between Gilroy and San Francisco is still active, either signed as Business US 101 or as SR 82. The US 101A bypass, however, is mostly discontinuous and is paralleled by the actual freeway, in some cases serving as an access road to the freeway.

Large parts of the old Business US 101 and SR 82 surface roads between San Francisco and San Diego are designated El Camino Real (The Royal Road), a designation originally given any thoroughfare under the direct authority of the King of Spain and his viceroys. These portions constitute the first major road in California.

Before the Golden Gate Bridge was completed, US 101 was divided in the San Francisco Bay Area. US 101W followed the same general right-of-way of today's US 101 from San Jose to San Francisco. US 101E generally followed the right-of-way taken by today's I-880 from San Jose to Oakland, then across the Carquinez Bridge to follow what is now SR 37, joining US 101W. Since there was no Golden Gate Bridge yet, US 101W used a ferry across the Golden Gate Strait. As today, US 101W proceeded up Van Ness, but without any left turn at Lombard, ending at the Hyde Street Pier. From there, motorists would drive onto a ferry boat which would cross the Golden Gate to Sausalito, where they would drive off the ferry directly onto the main street of Sausalito, which was signed for US 101 once again.

The US 101E designation was removed by the 1940s and became SR 17 (later I-880 and I-580) between San Jose and Santa Cruz. As the Bayshore Freeway was built along the east side of the San Francisco peninsula in the early 1950s, old US 101 along the El Camino Real was posted as US 101 Alternate or US 101A, and the freeway was marked US 101 Bypass or US 101B. In 1964, when California renumbered numerous state highways, El Camino was renumbered SR 82 and the Bayshore Freeway lost the bypass designation.

Major intersections
California
  in Los Angeles
  in Los Angeles
  in Los Angeles
  in Los Angeles
  in Los Angeles
  in San Jose
  in San Jose
  on the San Bruno–South San Francisco city line
  in San Francisco
  in San Francisco
  in San Rafael
  northeast of Crescent City
Oregon
  in Reedsport
  in Florence
  in Newport
  at Hebo
  northeast of Cannon Beach, southeast of Seaside
  in Astoria
Washington
  near Ilwaco
  near Naselle
  in Aberdeen
  at Discovery Bay
  near Shelton
  near Olympia
  in Tumwater

See also
BC Highway 101, a Canadian extension of the highway.
Special routes of U.S. Route 101

References

External links

Historic101.com
Endpoints of U.S. Highway 101

 
01-1